Joey Shaw (born 22 August 1969, in Milan, Italy) is an Italian celebrity photographer. Shaw is known, for his works in the fashion industry and the celebrity photography with his covers and features for the H magazine. He's also the author of the photographic book Shades of Glamour and the dedicated to Noura Hussein campaign published by Editoriale Italiano.

Career

Joey Shaw got his start in the fashion industry shooting models in Milan in the 90s. After gaining notice in the Milan and Paris fashion scene, he shot his first campaign for Vogue magazine and the fashion shows for Vogue Italy and "Style" magazine. 
 
Since 1994, Shaw went back to Los Angeles very often to start shooting actresses and actors and keep on doing fashion editorials with the Hollywood stars like Debby Ryan, Anna Camp, Adam Rodriguez, Sarah Hyland, Lori Loughlin, Lisa Edelstein, Tobin Bell, Ernie Hudson, Deborah Ann Woll, Isabelle Fuhrman, Jessica Lowndes, Kathleen Robertson, Taylor Spreitler, Ross McCall, Jessica Lowndes, Deborah Ann Woll.

Shaw also photographed 2 calendars; a glamour one shot in Lanzarote, Canary Islands in 2005 with the Playmate Zsuzsanna Ripli  and a fashion one shot in Milan in 2007, both of them for the Next magazine.

Shaw did campaigns for Vodafone, Emirates (airline), The North Face, Expedia, Hilton Hotels & Resorts, Société Générale, Mastercard, Banca Etruria. 
In May 2015 the Shaw introduced the XS campaign,

In July 2015, Shaw launched the "1+1= couple" campaign for the H mag.

December 2015, Shaw photographed the actress Deborah Ann Woll for Exit magazine. The magazine also interviewed Shaw.

In January 2016 the new international XS campaign has been released in London and the Shaw is the author of all the photos for the new campaign.

In May 2017, Editoriale Italiano released a new interview with the Shaw.

October 2017, the Photos magazine in the UK published the new interview with the Shaw.

May 2018, Kate magazine had a cover shot by Joey Shaw

On 26 June Shaw dedicated the new Editoriale Italiano campaign to Noura Hussein

Books
 The true story of a fashion photographer  (2007)
 Shades of Glamour  (2009)

References

External links
 Official Website

Fashion photographers
1969 births
Living people